Homostola is a genus of African mygalomorph spiders in the family Bemmeridae. It was first described by Eugène Louis Simon in 1892. Originally placed with the Ctenizidae, it was transferred to the wafer trapdoor spiders in 1985, and to the Bemmeridae in 2020. It is a senior synonym of Stictogaster and Paromostola.

Species
 it contains five species, all found in South Africa:
Homostola abernethyi (Purcell, 1903) – South Africa
Homostola pardalina (Hewitt, 1913) – South Africa
Homostola reticulata (Purcell, 1902) – South Africa
Homostola vulpecula Simon, 1892 (type) – South Africa
Homostola zebrina Purcell, 1902 – South Africa

See also
 List of Bemmeridae species

References

Further reading

Endemic fauna of South Africa
Mygalomorphae genera
Bemmeridae
Cyrtaucheniidae
Spiders of South Africa
Taxa named by Eugène Simon